Bethel Bible College or Bethel Gospel School was a Bible college founded in 1900 by Charles Parham in Topeka, Kansas, United States. The school is credited with starting the Pentecostal movement due to a series of fasting days that ended in what was interpreted as speaking in tongues on January 1, 1901. Although the school would close later in 1901 after less than two years of operation, the movement itself grew substantially to tens of millions of people around the world.

Pentecostalism begins

Forty students including Agnes Ozman had gathered to learn the major tenets of the Holiness Movement from Parham. Parham wondered about the New Testament evidence for baptism in the Holy Spirit. He went on a three-day trip and asked his students to ponder this question while he was gone. They concluded that glossolalia or speaking in tongues was proof that the Holy Spirit had fallen on an individual. Ozman was the first student to speak in tongues. Parham would take this message and hold special meetings in Joplin, MO and Houston, TX. In Houston, a black man named William Seymour heard the message and would take this teaching to Los Angeles where he would start the Azusa Street Revival. Today many Pentecostal denominations trace their beginnings to Bethel and Azusa Street.

Bethel Bible College also played a major role in the formation of the Assemblies of God, the world's largest Pentecostal denomination.

See also
 List of defunct colleges and universities in Kansas

References

Education in Topeka, Kansas
Pentecostalism in the United States
Defunct private universities and colleges in Kansas
Bible colleges
Educational institutions established in 1900
Educational institutions disestablished in 1901
Universities and colleges affiliated with the Church of God (Cleveland, Tennessee)
1900 establishments in Kansas
1901 disestablishments in Kansas